Flávio Vianna de Ulhôa Canto (born April 16, 1975, in Oxford, England) is a Brazilian judoka who competed in Men's 81 kg Judo.
He won the bronze medal at the 2004 Summer Olympics.
He is founder and president of the Instituto Reação, and also presenter of the TV shows Corujão do Esporte on TV Globo and Sensei on SportTV.

Biography
Flavio Canto was born in Oxford, England, where his father had a doctorate in nuclear physics. At two years old he came to Brazil and started Judo at fourteen. Despite starting Judo at a relatively advanced age, he was still able to compete at the national level in only five years. He is also a 6th degree black belt in Brazilian jiu-jitsu.
He married actress and presenter Fiorella Mattheis in 2013, divorcing in 2014.

Judo career
Flávio Canto was selected in national team for the first time in 1995 when he won the bronze medal at the Pan American Games in Mar del Plata.
In 1996 he got the 7th place at the Olympics in Atlanta and in 1999 was silver medalist in the Pan American Games in Winnipeg (Canada).
He missed Sydney Olympic games qualification in 2000. He was Panam Games champion in 2003 in Santo Domingo. In 2004, in Athens, he eventually got the bronze olympic medal.
World Ranking Leader U81kg in 2010 he retired from competition in 2012.

Instituto Reação social project
In 2003 Flávio Canto created Instituto Reação, a non-governmental organization that promotes human development and social inclusion through sports and education, promoting judo from the sport initiation to a level of high performance. Instituto Reação works in low-income communities in Rio de Janeiro including  Rocinha,  Pequena Cruzada, Cidade de Deus and Tubiacanga.
The Institute serves about 1,000 children and young people between 4 and 25 years old and has played a prominent role in competitions, including having helped train the current Olympic and world junior judo champion, Rafaela Silva Lopes.

References

External links
 
 

 Fightland - Inside Instituto Reação Flavio Canto's social project in Rio de Janeiro Vice Media
  Profile
  Blog do Flávio Canto
  Instituto Reação

1975 births
Living people
English emigrants to Brazil
Judoka at the 1996 Summer Olympics
Judoka at the 2004 Summer Olympics
Judoka at the 1995 Pan American Games
Judoka at the 1999 Pan American Games
Judoka at the 2003 Pan American Games
Olympic judoka of Brazil
Olympic bronze medalists for Brazil
Olympic medalists in judo
Medalists at the 2004 Summer Olympics
Brazilian male judoka
Pan American Games gold medalists for Brazil
Pan American Games silver medalists for Brazil
Pan American Games bronze medalists for Brazil
Pan American Games medalists in judo
South American Games gold medalists for Brazil
South American Games medalists in judo
Competitors at the 2002 South American Games
Medalists at the 1995 Pan American Games
Medalists at the 1999 Pan American Games
Medalists at the 2003 Pan American Games